Thomas Bostick could refer to: 

Thomas P. Bostick (born 1956), U.S. Army General
Thomas G. Bostick Jr., U.S. Army officer killed in Afghanistan, for whom Forward Operating Base Bostick is named

See also
Thomas Edward Bostock, Mayor of Geelong